The Complete Columbia Recordings of Miles Davis with John Coltrane is a box set featuring jazz musicians Miles Davis and John Coltrane. It is the first box set in a series of eight from Columbia/Legacy compiling Davis's work for Columbia Records, and includes never-before-released alternate takes, omissions of other musicians, musician comments, false starts and a first version of compositions, some of which have made it to the 50th Anniversary 2-disc CD version of Kind of Blue. Originally issued on April 11, 2000 in a limited-edition metal slipcase, it was reissued in 2004 in an oversized book format. In conjunction with Sony, Mosaic Records released the 9 LP set.

Albums
Davis' and Coltrane's work together for Columbia produced three studio albums, two tracks from a fourth, and two live albums, all of which are contained in this box set:

'Round About Midnight (released March 4, 1957)
Milestones (released September 2, 1958)
Kind of Blue (released August 17, 1959)
Someday My Prince Will Come (released December 11, 1961) (2 tracks only)
Miles & Monk at Newport (released May 11, 1964) (A-side only), reissued as Miles Davis at Newport 1958 in 2001
Jazz at the Plaza (released September 28, 1973)

Track listing

Personnel
Recorded between October 26, 1955 and March 21, 1961 in New York City (except disk 5, tracks 3–9, recorded in Newport, RI).

 Miles Davis – trumpet
 John Coltrane – tenor saxophone
 Hank Mobley – tenor saxophone (Disc 5: track 1)
 Cannonball Adderley – alto saxophone (Disc 2: tracks 10-13; Disc 3; Disc 4: tracks 1, 6–9; Disc 5: tracks 3–9; Disc 6)
 Red Garland – piano (Disc 1; Disc 2; Disc 3: tracks 1–6)
 Bill Evans – piano (Disc 3: tracks 7–10; Disk 4: track 1, 4–9; Disc 5: tracks 3–9; Disc 6)
 Wynton Kelly – piano (Disc 4: tracks 2–3; Disc 5: tracks 1–2)
 Paul Chambers – bass
 Philly Joe Jones – drums  (Disc 1; Disc 2; Disc 3: tracks 1–6)
 Jimmy Cobb – drums  (Disc 3: tracks 7–10; Disk 4; Disc 5; Disc 6)

References

Compilation albums published posthumously
John Coltrane compilation albums
Miles Davis compilation albums
2000 compilation albums
Columbia Records compilation albums
Albums recorded at CBS 30th Street Studio
Albums produced by Teo Macero
Albums produced by Michael Cuscuna
Albums produced by George Avakian
Albums produced by Irving Townsend